The Governor-General of Australia has, at irregular intervals, notified for general information the positioning of the wearing of Australian Orders, Decorations and Medals in the Commonwealth of Australia Gazette. The Order of Wearing Australian Honours and Awards was last published in 2007, and replaced the previous list published in 2002.

Prior to 2002, the lists were named the Australian Order of Precedence of Honours and Awards.  With the cessation in 2013 of the gazettal of lists of recipients of Australia Day and Queen’s Birthday Honours, it is not yet known if future issues of the Order of Wearing Australian Honours and Awards will be gazetted.

Order of Wearing 
Order of wearing decorations and awards within the Australian honours system.

Honours and Awards listed are:
 those within the Australian System of Honours and Awards;
 those conferred by The Sovereign in exercise of the royal prerogative;
 those within the Order of St John; and
 foreign awards, the acceptance and wearing of which have been authorised by the Governor-General.

Note that awards of the British Empire/United Kingdom are now considered foreign (if awarded after 5 October 1992), and should be worn accordingly.

  Victoria Cross/Victoria Cross for Australia VC
 Cross of Valour CV 
 Knight/Lady Companion of the Order of the Garter KG/LG
 Knight/Lady of the Order of the Thistle KT/LT
 Member of the Order of Merit OM (Civil Division and Military Division)
 Knight/Dame of the Order of Australia{{NoteTag|"Provision for further awards at this level within the Order of Australia was removed by Her Majesty The Queen on 3 March 1986 on the advice of the Prime Minister. The grade was reinstated on 25 March 2014 on the advice of the Prime Minister." Order of Wearing, Page 5, Note 2.}}  AK/AD
  Knight/Dame Grand Cross of the Royal Victorian Order GCVO
 Companion of the Order of Australia (General Division) AC  (Military Division)
 Knight/Dame Commander of the Royal Victorian Order KCVO/DCVO
 Officer of the Order of Australia (General Division) AO  (Military Division)
 Commander of the Royal Victorian Order CVO
 Star of Gallantry SG
 Star of Courage SC
 Distinguished Service Cross DSC
 Member of the Order of Australia (General Division) AM  (Military Division)
 Lieutenant of the Royal Victorian Order LVO
 Member of the Royal Victorian Order MVO
 Conspicuous Service Cross CSC
 Nursing Service Cross NSC
 Medal for Gallantry MG
 Bravery Medal BM
 Distinguished Service Medal DSM
 Public Service Medal PSM
 Australian Police Medal APM
 Australian Fire Service Medal AFSM
 Ambulance Service Medal ASM
 Emergency Services Medal ESM
 Australian Corrections Medal ACM
 Australian Intelligence Medal  AIM
 Medal of the Order of Australia (General Division) OAM  (Military Division)
 Order of St John
 Conspicuous Service Medal CSM
 Australian Antarctic Medal AAM
 Royal Victorian Medal RVM
 Commendation for Gallantry
 Commendation for Brave Conduct
 Commendation for Distinguished Service
 Australia Service Medal 1939-45
 Australian Active Service Medal 1945–1975
 Vietnam Medal
 Vietnam Logistic and Support Medal
 Australian Active Service Medal
 International Force East Timor Medal (INTERFET)
 Afghanistan Medal
 Iraq Medal
 Australian Service Medal 1945–1975
 Australian General Service Medal for Korea
 Australian Service Medal
 Australian Operational Service Medal – Border Protection
 Australian Operational Service Medal – Greater Middle East Operation
 Australian Operational Service Medal – Special Operations
 Australian Operational Service Medal - Counter Terrorism/Special Recovery
 Australian Operational Service Medal – Civilian
 Rhodesia Medal
 Police Overseas Service Medal
 Humanitarian Overseas Service Medal
 National Emergency Medal
 Civilian Service Medal 1939–1945
 National Police Service Medal
 King Edward VII Coronation Medal (1902)
 King George V Coronation Medal (1911)
 King George V Silver Jubilee Medal (1935)
 King George VI Coronation Medal (1937)
 Queen Elizabeth II Coronation Medal (1953)
 Queen Elizabeth II Silver Jubilee Medal (1977)
 Queen Elizabeth II Golden Jubilee Medal (2002)
 Queen Elizabeth II Diamond Jubilee Medal (2012)
 Queen Elizabeth II Platinum Jubilee Medal (2022)
 80th Anniversary Armistice Remembrance Medal (1999)
 Australian Sports Medal (2000)
 Centenary Medal (2001)
 Defence Force Service Medal
 Reserve Force Decoration RFD
 Reserve Force Medal
 Defence Long Service Medal
 National Medal
 Australian Defence Medal
 Australian Cadet Forces Service Medal
 Champion Shots Medal
Long Service Medals
 Service Medal of the Order of St John
 Anniversary of National Service 1951–1972 Medal
Foreign Awards (in order of date of authorisation of their acceptance and wearing).

 Citations 
The following citations are not positioned according to the list above. For members of the uniformed services, they are worn according to respective Service dress rules. For civilians, they are worn centrally above any other honours or awards:
  Unit Citation for Gallantry
  Meritorious Unit Citation
  Group Bravery Citation

 Foreign awards 
Approved foreign awards are published by the Governor-General and may be found on the Schedule of Approved Countries and Awards.

The following are international and foreign honours commonly awarded to Australians for various reasons.

For foreign awards commonly awarded to Australians for campaign and peacekeeping service please refer to the list on Australian Campaign Medals.

 See also 

 Orders, decorations, and medals of Australia
 Post-nominal letters
 List of post-nominal letters (Australia)
 Australian Commendations and Citations

 Notes 

 References 

 External links 
 It's an Honour – Australian government website
Wearing Awards – Australian government It's an Honour website
Defence Honours & Awards– Australian Defence Force website
 The Defence Honours and Awards Manual (DHAM)
 Chapter 4 of the manual includes a link to the "current" (2007) Order of Wearing, but more usefully:
 Annex A contains: A modified order of wearing that is designed to make the order of wearing Defence awards more easily understood ... The modified version provides a complete list of all awards by incorporating those campaign and other medals that are included separately in annexes to the original schedule.''

Honours Order of Wearing
+